Cremonesi is an Italian surname. Notable people with the surname include:

Carlo Cremonesi (1866–1943), Italian cardinal
Filippo Cremonesi (1872–1942), Italian banker and politician
Michele Cremonesi (born 1988), Italian footballer

Italian-language surnames